Elections to Ballymena Borough Council were held on 20 May 1981 on the same day as the other Northern Irish local government elections. The election used four district electoral areas to elect a total of 21 councillors.

Election results

Note: "Votes" are the first preference votes.

Districts summary

|- class="unsortable" align="centre"
!rowspan=2 align="left"|Ward
! % 
!Cllrs
! % 
!Cllrs
! %
!Cllrs
!rowspan=2|TotalCllrs
|- class="unsortable" align="center"
!colspan=2 bgcolor="" | DUP
!colspan=2 bgcolor="" | UUP
!colspan=2 bgcolor="white"| Others
|-
|align="left"|Area A
|bgcolor="#D46A4C"|42.8
|bgcolor="#D46A4C"|2
|37.8
|1
|19.4
|1
|4
|-
|align="left"|Area B
|bgcolor="#D46A4C"|68.0
|bgcolor="#D46A4C"|4
|32.0
|2
|0.0
|0
|6
|-
|align="left"|Area C
|bgcolor="#D46A4C"|66.6
|bgcolor="#D46A4C"|4
|31.5
|1
|1.9
|0
|5
|-
|align="left"|Area D
|bgcolor="#D46A4C"|41.9
|bgcolor="#D46A4C"|3
|21.7
|1
|36.4
|2
|6
|-
|- class="unsortable" class="sortbottom" style="background:#C9C9C9"
|align="left"| Total
|55.5
|13
|30.0
|5
|14.5
|3
|21
|-
|}

Districts results

Area A

1977: 2 x DUP, 1 x UUP, 1 x Independent
1981: 2 x DUP, 1 x UUP, 1 x Independent
1977-1981 Change: No change

Area B

1977: 4 x DUP, 2 x UUP
1981: 4 x DUP, 2 x UUP
1977-1981 Change: No change

Area C

1977: 3 x DUP, 2 x Independent Unionist
1981: 4 x DUP, 1 x UUP
1977-1981 Change: DUP and UUP gain from Independent Unionist (two seats)

Area D

1977: 2 x DUP, 1 x UUP, 1 x Alliance, 1 x Independent, 1 x Independent Unionist
1981: 3 x DUP, 1 x UUP, 1 x Independent, 1 x Independent Unionist
1977-1981 Change: DUP gain from Alliance

References

Ballymena Borough Council elections
Ballymena